Administrative System of FATA was the system by which semi-autonomous tribal region of Federally Administered Tribal Areas was governed.

Historical Constitutional Status of FATA 
Before 25th Amendment to Constitution of Pakistan, FATA was federally administrated special territory of Pakistan and was included among the territories of Pakistan in Article 1. FATA was governed primarily through the Frontier Crimes Regulation 1901. It was administered directly by Governor of the Khyber Pakhtunkhwa (KP) in his capacity as an agent to the President of Pakistan, under the overall supervision of the Ministry of States and Frontier Regions in Islamabad.

Laws framed by the Parliament did not apply there, unless were ordered by the President, who was also empowered to issue regulations for the peace and good government of the tribal areas.

Representation in Parliament  
People of FATA were represented in the Parliament of Pakistan by their elected representatives both in National Assembly of Pakistan and the Senate of Pakistan. FATA had 12 members in the National Assembly and 8 members in the Senate. FATA had no representation in the Provincial Assembly of Khyber-Pakhtunkhwa.

FATA Secretariat 
Decisions related to development planning in tribal areas were taken by the FATA section of the KP Planning and Development Department, and implemented by KP Government. The FATA Secretariat was set up in 2002, headed by the Secretary FATA. Four years later, in 2006, the Civil Secretariat of FATA was established to take over decision-making functions.

Departments 
The six departments of now-defunct FATA Secretariat were as follows:

 Administration, Infrastructure & Coordination Department
 Finance Department
 Law & Order Department
 Planning & Development Department
 Production & Livelihood Development Department
 Social Sectors Department

Directorates 
In addition to departments following directorates:
 Health
 Education
 Forestry
 Fisheries
 Irrigation
 Livestock & Dairy Development
 Minerals & Technical Education
 Agriculture
 Sports
 Social Welfare
 Roads and other infrastructure development

Political Agents 
Each Agencies of the Federally Administered Tribal Areas was administered by a Political Agent (PA), assisted by a number of Assistant Political Agents (APA), Tehsildars (administrative head of a tehsil) and Naib Tehsildars (deputy tehsildar).

The Judicial System 
All civil and criminal cases in FATA were decided under the Frontier Crimes Regulation 1901 by a jirga (council of elders). Residents of tribal areas had, however, right to approach the FATA Tribunal challenging a decision issued under the 1901 Regulation.

Merger with KP 
The FATA was merged into province of Khyber Pakhtunkhwa by Parliament thorough 25th Amendment to Constitution of Pakistan that was approved in 2018. Under 25th Amendment following changes took effect:
 FCR was repealed and replaced with the new Rewaj Regulation for Tribal Areas
 Party-based Provincial Government elections were held for the first time in erstwhile-Fata in July 2019.
 Jurisdiction of the Supreme Court of Pakistan and the Peshawar High Court was extended to erstwhile-Fata.
 Ex-Fata elected their own representatives to the K-P Assembly.

See also 
 Frontier Crimes Regulation
 Economy of the Federally Administered Tribal Areas
 FATA Development Authority
 FATA Disaster Management Authority

References

External links 
 

Federally Administered Tribal Areas
Provincial Governments of Pakistan